Edward H. "Ned" Thomson III (born 1953) is an American Republican Party politician who has represented the 30th Legislative District in the New Jersey General Assembly since August 2017. He replaced Dave Rible, who left office to serve as Director of the New Jersey Division of Alcoholic Beverage Control. Thomson had previously served as mayor of Wall Township.

He serves since 2022 as the Minority Conference Leader in the General Assembly.

Early life and education
Born in Neptune City, New Jersey, Thomson grew up in Avon-by-the-Sea, New Jersey. Thomson attended the New Jersey Institute of Technology, where he majored in actuarial science, and the College of Insurance, majoring in business administration.

Career
He served from 1995 to 2017 as a trustee of the New Jersey Public Employees Retirement System. He served on the Wall Township Board of Adjustment from 1990 to 1997 and on the township's Planning Board from 1997 to 2007 and again from 2013 to 2017. He served on the Wall Township Committee from 1998 to 2008, and was chosen by his peers to serve as mayor in 2002 and 2005. Thomson is president of E.H. Thomson and Co., which administers pensions for third party firms.

Having been nominated by Governor of New Jersey Chris Christie in June 2017, Assemblyman Dave Rible resigned his seat on July 17, 2017, to become Director of the New Jersey Division of Alcoholic Beverage Control after being confirmed by the New Jersey Senate. At a special convention held on August 4, Thomson was selected by Republican county committee members on the first ballot to replace Rible from a ballot of three candidates and was selected by acclimation to fill the ballot spot for a full two-year term the November election; for the interim seat, Thomson received 83 of the 154 ballots, ahead of Justin Flancbaum of the Lakewood Municipal Utility Authority with 53 votes and Jim Bean, a former councilmember from Belmar, with 18. He was sworn into office and took his Assembly seat on August 24.

In the November 2017 general election, Thomson (with 30,680 votes; 30.3% of all ballots cast) and his running mate, four-term incumbent Sean T. Kean (with 33,672; 33.3%), defeated Democratic challengers Kevin Scott (18,737; 18.5%) and Eliot Arlo Colon (18,160; 17.9%) to win both Assembly seats from the district for the Republicans.

Committees 
Committee assignments for the current session are:
Law and Public Safety
State and Local Government
Transportation and Independent Authorities
Joint Committee on Housing Affordability

District 30
Each of the 40 districts in the New Jersey Legislature has one representative in the New Jersey Senate and two members in the New Jersey General Assembly. The representatives from the 30th District for the 2022—23 Legislative Session are:
Senator Robert Singer (R)
Assemblyman Sean T. Kean (R)
Assemblyman Ned Thomson (R)

References

External links
Legislative webpage

1953 births
Living people
American actuaries
Mayors of places in New Jersey
Politicians from Monmouth County, New Jersey
Republican Party members of the New Jersey General Assembly
New Jersey city council members
New Jersey Institute of Technology alumni
People from Avon-by-the-Sea, New Jersey
People from Neptune City, New Jersey
People from Wall Township, New Jersey
21st-century American politicians